Michael T. Mainieri Jr. (born July 4, 1938) is an American vibraphonist, known for his work with the jazz fusion group Steps Ahead. He is married to the singer-songwriter and harpist Dee Carstensen.

Biography
Mainieri was born in The Bronx, New York, United States. Mainieri was a pioneer in introducing an electronic vibraphone, known as a synth-vibe, and has recorded with such musicians as Buddy Rich, Wes Montgomery and Jeremy Steig. He performed for a live album by Laura Nyro and was featured on several tracks from the Dire Straits album, Love Over Gold (1982), as well as on "Ride Across the River" on the album Brothers in Arms (1985). He performed on the albums Heads by Bob James, Heart to Heart by David Sanborn, and Tiger in the Rain by Michael Franks.

He has also released numerous albums and videos as a leader for a variety of labels, most notably his 1980 album for Warner Bros. titled Wanderlust, which featured Michael Brecker and other members of Steps Ahead. He produced three albums for Carly Simon. Mainieri married singer-songwriter/harpist Dee Carstensen in 1993.

Discography

As leader 
 Blues on the Other Side (Argo, 1963) (as The Mike Manieri Quartet)
 Journey Thru an Electric Tube (Solid State, 1968)
 Insight (Solid State, 1968) (as The Mike Manieri Quartet)
 Love Play (Arista, 1977)
 Free Smiles: Live at Montreaux 1978 (Arista Novus, 1978) (with Warren Bernhardt)
 Wanderlust (Warner Bros., 1981)
 Man Behind Bars (NYC, 1995)
 An American Diary (NYC, 1995)
 Live at the Seventh Avenue South (NYC,1996) (as The Mike Manieri Quartet)
 An American Diary: The Dreamings (NYC, 1997)
 Northern Lights (NYC, 2006)
 L'Image 2.0 (L'Image, 2009)
 Crescent  (NYC, 2010)

As group

With Arista All Stars 
 Blue Montreux (Arista, 1979) – live

With Steps Ahead 
Studio albums
 Step by Step (1980)
 Steps Ahead (1983)
 Modern Times (1984)
 Magnetic (1986)
 N.Y.C. (1989)
 Yin-Yang (1992)
 Vibe (1994)
 Steppin Out (2016)

Live albums
 Smokin' in the Pit (1980)
 Paradox (1982)
 Live in Tokyo 1986 (1986)
 Holding Together: Live in Europe 1999 (2002)

As sideman 
With Dire Straits
 Love over Gold (Vertigo, 1982)
 Brothers in Arms (Vertigo, 1985) – recorded in 1984-85

With Eliane Elias
 Dreamer (Bluebird, 2004)
 Dance of Time (Concord, 2017)

With Art Farmer
 Big Blues with Jim Hall (CTI, 1979) – recorded in 1978
 Yama with Joe Henderson (CTI, 1979)

With Michael Franks
 Tiger in the Rain (Warner Bros., 1979) – recorded in 1978
 Time Together (Shanachie, 2011)

With Tim Hardin
 Tim Hardin 4 (Verve, 1969)
 Bird on a Wire (Columbia, 1971)

With Don McLean
 American Pie (United Artists, 1971)
 Playin' Favorites (United Artists, 1973)

With Buddy Rich
 Buddy Rich Just Sings (Verve, 1957)
 Richcraft (Mercury, 1959)
 The Driver (EmArcy, 1960)
 Playtime (Argo, 1961) – recorded in 1960
 Blues Caravan (Verve, 1962) – recorded in 1961

With Carly Simon
 Spy (Elektra, 1979)
 Come Upstairs (Warner Bros., 1980)
 Torch (Warner Bros., 1981)
 Hello Big Man (Warner Bros., 1983)

With Paul Simon
 Paul Simon (Columbia, 1972) – recorded in 1971
 Hearts and Bones (Warner Bros., 1983) – recorded in 1981-83

With Sonny Stitt
 What's New!!! (Roulette, 1966)
 I Keep Comin' Back! (Roulette, 1966)

With Kazumi Watanabe
 To Chi Ka (Columbia, 1980)
 Dogatana (Denon, 1981)
 One for All (Polydor, 1999) – live
 Lotus Night (Warner Music, 2016) – live

With others
 Aerosmith, Toys in the Attic (Columbia, 1975) - conductor
 Manny Albam, The Soul of the City (Solid State, 1966)
 George Benson, Livin' Inside Your Love (Warner Bros., 1979)
 Stephen Bishop, Red Cab to Manhattan (Warner Bros., 1980)
 Kenny Burrell, A Generation Ago Today (Verve, 1967)
 Marnix Busstra Trio, Twelve Pieces (Buzz Music, 2006)
 Marc Cohn, The Rainy Season (Atlantic, 1993)
 Paul Desmond, Summertime (CTI, 1968)
 Urbie Green, The Fox (CTI, 1976)
 Jake Holmes, How Much Time (Columbia, 1972)
 Janis Ian, Night Rains (Columbia, 1979) – recorded in 1978
 Bob James, Heads (Tappan Zee, 1977)
 Garland Jeffreys, Garland Jeffreys (Atlantic, 1973)
 Billy Joel, 52nd Street (Columbia, 1978)
 Etta Jones, Etta Jones Sings (Roulette, 1966) – recorded in 1965
 Mark Knopfler, Local Hero (Vertigo, 1983) – recorded in 1982
 Nils Lofgren, I Came to Dance (A&M Records, 1977)
 Pat Martino, Starbright (Warner Bros., 1976)
 Paul McCartney, Kisses on the Bottom (Hear Music, 2012)
 Brother Jack McDuff, Who Knows What Tomorrow's Gonna Bring? (Blue Note, 1970)
 Marcus Miller, Suddenly (Warner Bros., 1983)
 Monday Orchestra, Never Alone: The Music of Michael Brecker (Barnum For Art, 2018) – recorded in 2017
 Wes Montgomery, Down Here on the Ground (CTI, 1968) – recorded in 1967-68
 Linda Ronstadt, Living in the USA (Asylum, 1978)
 Ali Ryerson, Con Brio! (ACR Music, 2011)
 David Sanborn, Time Again (Verve, 2003)
 Boz Scaggs, Speak Low (Decca, 2008)
 Chris Smither, Honeysuckle Dog (Okra-Tone, 2005) – recorded in 1973
 Bert Sommer, Bert Sommer (Buddah, 1970)
 Swiss Jazz Orchestra, Pools: Live at Jazzfestival Bern (Mons, 2016) – live recorded in 2015
 Livingston Taylor, Over the Rainbow (Capricorn, 1972)
 Tony Orlando and Dawn, Dawn's New Ragtime Follies (Bell, 1973) – recorded in 1972-73
 Stefano Zeni, Parallel Paths (Zanetti, 2018)

References

External links
Official web site

Mike's featured page on the Party Of The Century international music project
Mike Mainieri interview at allaboutjazz.com

1938 births
Living people
American jazz vibraphonists
American jazz bandleaders
American people of Italian descent
People from the Bronx
Jazz musicians from New York (state)
Steps Ahead members
White Elephant Orchestra members